Brad Guan (born 10 July 1958) is a former professional tennis player from Australia.

Grand Slam career
Guan made his first appearance in the main singles draw of a Grand Slam at the 1981 Australian Open, where he lost in the opening round to Pat Du Pré, in five sets. He was also beaten in the first round of the 1982 French Open, by Juan Avendaño, but made the men's doubles quarter-finals, with Derek Tarr as his partner. This equaled his best Grand Slam performance, as he also reached the quarter-finals in the doubles at the 1980 Australian Open, partnering Ernie Ewart. His best singles effort came when he made the third round at the 1982 Australian Open.

Grand Prix tour
On the Grand Prix tennis circuit, Guan made one doubles final, at the 1979 Australian Hard Court Tennis Championships with Phil Davies. They lost to John James and Chris Kachel. He was a singles quarter-finalist at Brisbane's South Pacific Tennis Classic in 1981.

Challenger circuit
At an ATP Challenger tournament in Perth in 1982, Guan had a win over John Fitzgerald. He won five Challenger doubles titles during his career.

Grand Prix career finals

Doubles: 1 (0–1)

Challenger titles

Doubles: (5)

References

1958 births
Living people
Australian male tennis players
Place of birth missing (living people)
20th-century Australian people